Sang Yang (Chinese: , Sāng Yáng; born: 17 July 1982) is a retired Chinese badminton player and former Olympian from Zhejiang.

Career 
Sang started representing China in the junior tournament, and at the 1998 and 2000 Asian Junior Championships, he helped the boys' team clinched the gold medal. He won the individual medals captured the boys' doubles gold and boys' singles silver in 1999, and also boys' doubles gold and mixed doubles silver in 2000. At the 2000 World Junior Championships, he won three gold medals in the boys' doubles, mixed doubles and team event.

Sang won the 2003 Indonesia Open in the men's doubles with partner Zheng Bo. In 2004 they defeated Denmark's Jens Eriksen and Martin Lundgaard in the Thomas Cup final to clinch the deciding third point for the Chinese team.

Sang competed for China in badminton at the 2004 Summer Olympics also in men's doubles with Zheng Bo. They had a bye in the first round and defeated Chan Chong Ming and Chew Choon Eng of Malaysia in the second.  In the quarterfinals, Sang and Zheng lost 7-15, 11-15 to Korea's Kim Dong-moon and Ha Tae-kwon who went on to win the gold medal.

Sang retired on 22 March  2007, because of an injury.

Achievements

World Championships 
Men's doubles

World Junior Championships 
Boys' doubles

Mixed doubles

Asian Junior Championships 
Boys' singles

Boys' doubles

Mixed doubles

IBF World Grand Prix 
The World Badminton Grand Prix sanctioned by International Badminton Federation (IBF) since 1983.

Men's doubles

IBF International 
Men's doubles

Mixed doubles

References

External links 
 
 

1982 births
Living people
Badminton players from Zhejiang
Chinese male badminton players
Badminton players at the 2004 Summer Olympics
Olympic badminton players of China